Julius Weinberg is a British academic and previously the Vice-Chancellor of Kingston University.

Weinberg is a governor of the Independent school Latymer Upper School in Hammersmith.

On 11 April 2017, Secretary of State for Education Justine Greening announced the appointment of Weinberg as the next Chair of Ofsted.

References

Living people
Academics of Kingston University
Academic staff of the University of Zimbabwe
Year of birth missing (living people)
Presidents of City, University of London